Pedro Alfonso Fernández Camacho (born July 27, 1977, in Caracas), known as Pedro Fernández or simply Fernández, is a retired Venezuelan footballer who played as midfielder in the Venezuelan Primera División and for the Venezuela national football team.

References

External links

 at BDFA.com.ar

1977 births
Living people
Association football midfielders
Venezuelan footballers
Deportivo Táchira F.C. players
UA Maracaibo players
Zulia F.C. players
Venezuela international footballers